The Hyattsville Historic District is a residential neighborhood comprising a national historic district located in the city of Hyattsville, Prince George's County, Maryland.  The district comprises approximately 600 structures, primarily houses, that exhibit late-19th and early-20th century design characteristics. The majority of residential buildings are of frame construction, the older ones with foundations of brick or (rarely) fieldstone, the newer of concrete. The architectural styles represented: grand "mansions," summer cottages, duplexes, Second Empire, Queen Anne, Italianate, Victorian, Bungalow, and Spanish.  The area also includes numerous vernacular buildings. The finest concentration of late-19th century structures occur in the area of Farragut, Gallatin, and Hamilton streets and 42nd Avenue. The early-20th century hipped-roof style and bungalows are found throughout the district.

It was listed on the National Register of Historic Places in 1982.  The district was expanded in 2004.

References

External links
, including photo in 1973, at Maryland Historical Trust website
Boundary Map of the Hyattsville Historic District, Prince George's County, at Maryland Historical Trust

Hyattsville, Maryland
Historic districts in Prince George's County, Maryland
Historic districts on the National Register of Historic Places in Maryland
National Register of Historic Places in Prince George's County, Maryland
Queen Anne architecture in Maryland